The 1983 Castilian-Manchegan regional election was held on Sunday, 8 May 1983, to elect the 1st Cortes of the autonomous community of Castilla–La Mancha. All 44 seats in the Cortes were up for election. The election was held simultaneously with regional elections in twelve other autonomous communities and local elections all throughout Spain.

Only two political parties were able to secure parliamentary representation in the Cortes: the Spanish Socialist Workers' Party (PSOE) under José Bono, which obtained 23 out of 44 seats—an absolute majority—and the People's Coalition, an electoral alliance formed by the conservative People's Alliance (AP), the christian democratic People's Democratic Party (PDP) and the Liberal Union (UL). As a result of the election, José Bono became the first democratically elected President of the Junta of Communities of Castilla–La Mancha.

Overview

Electoral system
The Cortes of Castilla–La Mancha were the devolved, unicameral legislature of the autonomous community of Castilla–La Mancha, having legislative power in regional matters as defined by the Spanish Constitution and the Castilian-Manchegan Statute of Autonomy, as well as the ability to vote confidence in or withdraw it from a regional president.

Transitory Provision First of the Statute established a specific electoral procedure for the first election to the Cortes of Castilla–La Mancha, to be supplemented by the provisions within Royal Decree-Law 20/1977, of 18 March, and its related regulations. Voting for the Cortes was on the basis of universal suffrage, which comprised all nationals over 18 years of age, registered in Castilla–La Mancha and in full enjoyment of their political rights. The 44 members of the Cortes of Castilla–La Mancha were elected using the D'Hondt method and a closed list proportional representation, with an electoral threshold of five percent of valid votes—which included blank ballots—being applied regionally. Seats were allocated to constituencies, corresponding to the provinces of Albacete, Ciudad Real, Cuenca, Guadalajara and Toledo, with each being allocated a fixed number of seats: 9 for Albacete, 10 for Ciudad Real, 8 for Cuenca, 7 for Guadalajara and 10 for Toledo.

The electoral law allowed for parties and federations registered in the interior ministry, coalitions and groupings of electors to present lists of candidates. Parties and federations intending to form a coalition ahead of an election were required to inform the relevant Electoral Commission within fifteen days of the election call, whereas groupings of electors needed to secure the signature of at least one-thousandth of the electorate in the constituencies for which they sought election—with a compulsory minimum of 500 signatures—disallowing electors from signing for more than one list of candidates.

Election date
The Junta of Communities of Castilla–La Mancha, in agreement with the Government of Spain, was required to call an election to the Cortes of Castilla–La Mancha within from 1 February to 31 May 1983. In the event of an investiture process failing to elect a regional president within a two-month period from the first ballot, the candidate from the party with the highest number of seats was to be deemed automatically elected.

Opinion polls
The tables below list opinion polling results in reverse chronological order, showing the most recent first and using the dates when the survey fieldwork was done, as opposed to the date of publication. Where the fieldwork dates are unknown, the date of publication is given instead. The highest percentage figure in each polling survey is displayed with its background shaded in the leading party's colour. If a tie ensues, this is applied to the figures with the highest percentages. The "Lead" column on the right shows the percentage-point difference between the parties with the highest percentages in a poll.

Voting preferences
The table below lists raw, unweighted voting preferences.

Results

Overall

Distribution by constituency

Aftermath

Notelist

References
Opinion poll sources

Other

1983 in Castilla–La Mancha
Castilla-La Mancha
Regional elections in Castilla–La Mancha
May 1983 events in Europe